Jane, Lady Cornwallis, later Lady Bacon (
Meautys; 1581–1659), was an English courtier and letter writer, whose correspondence was published (in 1842 in London, 8vo, and in 2003).

Jane Meautys was the daughter of Hercules Meautys of West Ham, and Philippe Cooke, daughter of Richard Cooke of Gidea Hall.

Jane, Lady Cornwallis
She was made a lady of the bedchamber to Anne of Denmark. This appointment was probably secured by Lucy Russell, Countess of Bedford.

Rumour connected her with "young Garret", an usher to the lord treasurer. However, in 1609, she married Sir William Cornwallis of Brome, Suffolk, over thirty years her senior. King James gave her a jewel provided by George Heriot worth £60. William Cornwallis died in 1611. Their only son, born in March 1611, Frederick, would later be styled Lord Cornwallis.

In 1609 a fellow courtier in the queen's household, and cousin of the Countess of Bedford, Bridget Markham, bequeathed her a set of diamond and ruby buttons. Anne of Denmark gave her a jewel of gold with diamonds, supplied by George Heriot, at her wedding, and gifts of four elaborate gowns in the following years.

Jane, Lady Bacon
On 1st May 1614, she married Nathaniel Bacon, of Culford, Suffolk, seventh (or ninth) son of Sir Nathaniel Bacon of Culford, High Sheriff of Norfolk and Suffolk. As the widow of a knight, she continued to be addressed by her title of "Lady Cornwallis" until Bacon himself was made a Knight of the Bath in February, 1626.

The couple resided at Brome Hall in Suffolk, a Cornwallis property that Lady Cornwallis held in trust for her minor son, Frederick.

Frederick Cornwallis married Elizabeth Ashburnham, daughter of Sir John Ashburnham and Elizabeth Villiers, at court in January 1631, but his mother did not attend because she was offended by some misdemeanour of his. Ashburnham's cousin, Susan Feilding, Countess of Denbigh, wrote to Bacon mentioning "her family be unfortunate", meaning their financial difficulty since her father's death in 1620.

Dorothy Randolph, a close friend and Meautys family cousin, had helped to arrange Frederick's marriage by searching for suitable partners. Randolph also sent news from London, and (much quoted) fashion advice for spring 1632;"I have sent you some patterns of stuff such as is worn by many, but not much lace upon those wrought stuffs; but the newest fashion is plain satin, of what colour one will, emboidered all over with 'alcomedes' (jewels and stones), but it is not like to hold past summer. They wear white satin waistcoats, plain, raised, printed, and some embroidered with lace, more than any one thing, and white Holland (linen) ones much".

In 1639 her daughter Anne Bacon married Thomas Meautys, despite the efforts of Philip Wodehouse who wrote poems to her. Anne later married Harbottle Grimston. Another daughter Jane Bacon died young. She was the grandmother Charles Cornwallis, 2nd Baron Cornwallis.

Jane, Lady Bacon died at Culford on 8 May 1659. In 1657 she had contracted with Thomas Stanton at St Andrew Holborn for her marble monument at Culford, agreeing the design with a drawing.

A painting in Government House, Sydney was recently identified as a portrait of Jane Cornwallis, attributed to her husband Nathaniel Bacon.  The garden front of Brome Hall appears in the background of the painting.

References

1581 births
1659 deaths
16th-century English writers
16th-century English women writers
17th-century English writers
17th-century English women writers
Jane
Jane
English letter writers
Women letter writers
British maids of honour
Ladies of the Bedchamber
Wives of knights
English courtiers
16th-century English people
Court of James VI and I
Household of Anne of Denmark